Tuguldur Galt is a Mongolian footballer who plays as defender for Erchim FC and the Mongolia national football team.

Career

Galt started his career with Erchim.

Playing for Erchim in an AFC Cup match against Kigwancha Sports Club, he headed the ball which inexplicably went into his own net.

He was nominated for 2017 Mongolian Footballer of the Year.

In 2018, he received interest from Uzbekistan clubs.

He is a Mongolia international.

Career statistics

International

Statistics accurate as of match played 5 October 2017

References

External links
 

Mongolian footballers
Mongolia international footballers
Association football defenders
Erchim players
Living people
1995 births
Mongolian National Premier League players